Iris bungei is a beardless iris in the genus Iris, in the subgenus Limniris and in the series Tenuifoliae of the genus. It is a rhizomatous herbaceous perennial, from Mongolia, Tibet and China. It has green leaves, short stem and 2 violet, purple, lavender or blue flowers.

Description
Iris bungei is intermediate in form between Iris tenuifolia and Iris ventricosa.

It has knobbly, woody, rhizomes. That can spread to create dense clumps of plants.

They have 4–7 veins on the leaves.

In some years, the flowers are barely above the soil.

It has one or two terminal (at the top of the stem) flower, between April and May (in Europe) and between May and June (in Asia).

Hence, reason for the common names of 'Big bud Iris' or 'Big Bract Iris'. Compared to Iris ventricosa, it has parallel veins on the spathes, instead of being reticulate.

It has 2 pairs of petals, 3 large sepals (outer petals), known as the 'falls' and 3 inner, smaller petals (or tepals, known as the 'standards'. They have a small, thin yellow signal area and are marked with purple veins or marks.

It has a 1.5 cm long pedicel, a filiform (Thread- or filament-shaped) 6–7 cm long perinath tube, 3 cm long stamens and 4.5–4 cm long ovary.

The capsule has 6 veins and a long beak-like appendage on the top.

Biochemistry
In May 2000, 2 new benzo-quinone derivatives, bungeiquinone and dihydrobungeiquinone, and two known derivatives, 3-hydroxyirisquinone  and 3-hydroxydihydroirisquinone, were isolated from the rhizome of Iris bungei. The structures of the new compounds were established on the basis of spectroscopic methods.

In 2001, several chemical compounds have been found in the rhizome of Iris bungei,  irisflavones A-D (newly found), irilin D (C17H14O7,), irilins A-B and tlatancuayin.

In 2001, 5 new peltogynoids, irisoids A—E, have been isolated from the rhizome of Iris bungei.

In 2008, five species of Iris commonly used as ingredients in Mongolian traditional medicine (Iris dichotoma Pall., Iris flavissima Pall.(later classified as a synonym of Iris humilis), Iris tenuifolia Pall., Iris lactea Pall. and Iris bungei Maxim.) were studied for the presence of phenolic acids.

In 2011, the seeds of Iris bungei were analysed and found to contain a new 'belamcandaquinone' chemical compound as well as others.

Genetics
As most irises are diploid, having two sets of chromosomes. This can be used to identify hybrids and classification of groupings.
It has a chromosome count: 2n=14

Taxonomy
It is written as 大苞鸢尾 in Chinese script and known as da bao yuan wei in China.
 
It is known as Bungyn tsaxildag in Mongolia. It is written as Ирис Бунге, in Russian alphabet.

It has the common name of Large-bract iris  or Big Bud Iris in China, and Bunge Iris.

The Latin specific epithet bungei refers to the Baltic German botanist Alexander Bunge (1803–1890).

A specimen plant can be seen in the Royal Botanic Garden Edinburgh, collected from Mongolia australis on 1 July 1871 by N.M. Przewalkski.

It was first published and described by Karl Maximowicz in the 'Bulletin of the Academy Imperial Sciences Saint Petersburg Vol.26 page509 in 1880.

It was verified by United States Department of Agriculture Agricultural Research Service on 4 April 2003.

Distribution and habitat
Iris bungei is native to temperate areas of eastern Asia.

Range
It is commonly found in Mongolia, within the Altai-Gobi and Altai Mountain Regions.

It can also be found in eastern Siberia, Tibet, and China, (in the provinces of Gansu, Nei Mongol, Ningxia and Shanxi).

Habitat
It can be found growing in sandy grasslands, in deserts and on dunes.

Cultivation
Iris bungei is rare in cultivation in the UK, Europe and USA.
Only grown by collectors and for scientific research.

It is hardy to USDA Zone 3, and needs mild and dry winters to survive.

It is best planted between September and October.

Specimen plants can be found growing in the Botanical Garden of the University of Halle.

Uses
It is used in traditional Chinese medicines.

The root of Iris bungei is a source of 'Irilin A' (an organic compound,) and 'Irilin B' (which is also found in red clover leaves,) and 'Irilin D', which are all used as Supplements. Tetra-hydroxy-6-methoxyisoflavone (or Irilin D) can be found in Iris japonica or belamcanda chinensis (Iris domestica).

In December 2005, plants of the ranges of Mongolia were studied for palatability by various farm animals. Iris bungei was not eaten by cattle and sheep, goat found the plant desirable, horses ate the plant (as a last resort) and camels found the plant edible.

Culture
On 15 October 1966, a postage stamp in Mongolia, had an illustration of Iris bunge.

References

Other sources
Chinese Academy of Sciences. 1959–. Flora reipublicae popularis sinicae.
Grubov, V. I. 2001. Key to the vascular plants of Mongolia.
Mathew, B. 1981. The Iris. 122.
Waddick, J. W. & Zhao Yu-tang. 1992. Iris of China.
Wu Zheng-yi & P. H. Raven et al., eds. 1994–. Flora of China (English edition).

External links

bungei
Flora of China
Flora of Tibet
Flora of Mongolia
Flora of Siberia
Garden plants of Asia
Plants described in 1880